Alexander Straub (born June 14, 1972) is an Internet and Telecom entrepreneur and investor.

Biography

Alexander Straub is a German-born entrepreneur, the head of the London firm  Straub Ventures, and Cambridge Accelerator Partners. He was a Rhodes Scholar at the University of Oxford. He holds degrees from Darmstadt (Dipl. Ing) and the other from Cornell (MEng). He also attended Stanford University. He also attended Oxford University as a Rhodes Scholar for Germany as a PhD Student.

In 1999, Straub and business partner Rouzbeh Pirouz won a Sunday Times entrepreneurship contest. With the prize money   and additional funding of around £7.6m they launched Mondus, an online B2B marketplace for SMEs .  By April 2000 the business was valued at £760 million (Financial Times Article). Later that year, in August, a 40.7% stake was sold to the  Italian firm  Seat Pagine Gialle for £100m in cash and shares. Soon after the transaction Straub was appointed as Vice Chairman. He moved to New York City to establish Lazard Technology Partners II, a $300 million venture fund, while Pirouz stayed on with Mondus. The duo later bought back Mondus  .

In 2006 he co-founded mobile Voice over IP specialist Truphone with James Tagg.   Straub was named Technology Pioneer at the World Economic Forum in 2007 and 2008 for his work with Truphone.

In 2007, Straub co-founded Pixsta, a visual search company that later merged into Empora Group.  Today, he remains  CEO and Chairman of Empora Group, which operates the social sharing network Fashionfreax and Avenue7. He acquired fashionfreax in 2010.

In early 2017 Straub launched SnapMe, an App-based e-commerce company, based on e-commerce enabled via computer vision, machine learning and A.I. in preparation for an augmented reality and VR enabled world.

Personal life 

Straub lives in London with his wife Tilla Lindig, founder of Luxury Family Affair, and three children.

References

External links
 Straub Ventures

1972 births
Living people
German expatriates in the United Kingdom
Cornell University alumni
Businesspeople from Bavaria
German Rhodes Scholars